Arthur Reginald Ferguson (9 April 1887 – 13 March 1969) was an Australian rules footballer who played for the Fitzroy Football Club and Melbourne Football Club in the Victorian Football League (VFL).

Family
The son of Robert Alexander Ferguson, and Fanny Ferguson, née Hood, Arthur Reginald Ferguson was born in Melbourne on 9 April 1887.

He married Rosabelle (a.k.a. Rosabella) Gordon (-1916) in 1911.

Notes

References

External links 
 
 
 Arthur Ferguson's playing statistics from The VFA Project
 Arthur Ferguson, at Demonwiki.

1887 births
1969 deaths
Australian rules footballers from Melbourne
Fitzroy Football Club players
Melbourne Football Club players